= Atollo =

Construction toy

ATOLLO is a construction toy invented by Scottish architect Donald Macdonald consisting of hinge and socket pieces.

== Information ==
Its appeal lies in the flexibility of the three-dimensional shapes it can create. Atollo is sold by Tomy. It is also somewhat compatible with other construction products, such as LEGO or Uberstix. It was distributed throughout the world throughout the years of 1993-2003. It won awards such as the Dr. Toy Award and Parents Choice Award. The toy was developed and designed by architect Donald Macdonald and Euan Macdonald. The toy is recommended for children ages five and up. It is possible that some of the pieces from Atollo can unintentionally get stuck together, but Atollo has created a tool that can separate them without breaking any pieces.

== Kits ==
The kits that were available for purchase include:

- Basic Starter Kit: a24-includes two colors and 24 pieces
- Beginners Kit: a48-includes four colors and 48 pieces
- a120 Kit- includes four colors and 120 pieces
- a240 Kit-includes four colors and 240 pieces
